Martin "MJ" Emerson Jr. (born September 27, 2000) is an American football cornerback for the Cleveland Browns of the National Football League (NFL). He played college football at Mississippi State.

Early life and high school
Emerson grew up in Pensacola, Florida and attended Pine Forest High School. As a senior, he had 91 tackles and two tackles for loss with four passes broken up, one interception, one forced fumble, and two fumble recoveries. Emerson was rated a three-star recruit and committed to play college football at Mississippi State over offers from Miami, Oregon and Ole Miss.

College career
Emerson played in all 13 of Mississippi State's games with five starts in his freshman season. As a sophomore, he had 72 total tackles and Southeastern Conference-high 11 pass breakups. Pro Football Focus rated Emerson the seventh-best cornerback in coverage in the nation and named him an honorable mention All-American.

Professional career

Emerson was selected by the Cleveland Browns with the 68th overall pick in the third round of the 2022 NFL Draft.

NFL career statistics

Regular season

References

External links
 Cleveland Browns bio
Mississippi State Bulldogs bio

2000 births
Living people
Players of American football from Pensacola, Florida
American football cornerbacks
Mississippi State Bulldogs football players
Cleveland Browns players